María Luisa Cordero Velásquez (born 23 January 1943) is a Chilean psychiatrist, writer, television commentator and politician.

Political career 
In 2012, she defined herself as an anti-communist. In 2013 she was criticized for saying that her vote “is worth 10 times more than [my] maid's”. During the 2021 political campaign she was asked if she had changed her mind on the subject, and she replied that “I still think the same”.  In 2021, she failed to gain a seat for the Chilean Constitutional Convention.

As congresswoman
In November 2021, she was elected to the House of Representatives.

References

External links
 

1943 births
Living people
Chilean people
Chilean people of Spanish descent
Chilean anti-communists
Pontifical Catholic University of Chile alumni
Christian Democratic Party (Chile) politicians
Chilean television personalities